Rudolf Risch (20 January 1908 – 22 August 1944) was a German racing cyclist. He finished in last place in the 1932 Tour de France.

References

External links

1908 births
1944 deaths
German male cyclists
Cyclists from Berlin
German military personnel killed in World War II